Eremaea × codonocarpa is a plant in the myrtle family, Myrtaceae and is endemic to the south-west of Western Australia. It is thought to be a stabilised hybrid between two subspecies of Eremaea. It is a small shrub with triangular leaves and flowers a shade of pink to purple on the ends of the branches.

Description
They have a covering of fine hairs and one, sometimes three veins on the lower surface.

The flowers are pink to deep pink and occur in small groups (usually pairs) on the end of short branches from longer ones formed the previous year. The outer surface of the flower cup (the hypanthium) is densely hairy. The stamens, which give the flower its colour, are arranged in 5 bundles, each containing 19 to 26 stamens. Flowering occurs from October to November and is followed by fruits which are woody capsules.

Taxonomy and naming
Eremaea × codonocarpa was first formally described in 1993 by Nuytsia in the journal Nuytsia from a specimen found near Jurien Bay. Hnatiuk considers Eremaea × codonocarpa to be a stabilised hybrid between Eremaea asterocarpa subsp. asterocarpa and Eremaea violacea subsp. raphiophylla. That view is supported by isozyme studies. The name codonocarpa is derived from the Ancient Greek words κώδων (kódon) meaning “bell” and καρπός (karpós) meaning "fruit", alluding to the urn-shaped or bell-shaped fruits.

Distribution and habitat
Eremaea × codonocarpa occurs in the Irwin district in the Geraldton Sandplains and Swan Coastal Plain biogeographic regions. It grows in sandy laterite on sandplains.

Conservation
Eremaea × codonocarpa is classified as "not threatened" by the Western Australian Government Department of Parks and Wildlife.

References

codonocarpa
Hybrid plants
Myrtales of Australia
Plants described in 1993
Endemic flora of Western Australia